Tiago Alexandre Baptista Ferreira (born 16 April 1975), known simply as Tiago, is a Portuguese former professional footballer who played as a goalkeeper, and the goalkeeper coach of Sporting CP.

Playing career
Born in Torres Vedras, Lisbon District, Tiago spent almost all of his career in Sporting CP. There, he successfully battled for first-choice status with Belgian international Filip De Wilde (1996–98), being loaned to C.F. Estrela da Amadora for two years during Peter Schmeichel's stint at the club. In the 2001–02 season, after the Dane returned to England, he played 18 matches as the Lions won the Primeira Liga championship, which was his second-best output during his spell.

In the following years, more of the same: from 2003 onwards, Tiago played second-fiddle to Ricardo. When the latter moved for Real Betis he backed up youth product Rui Patrício, and remained second or third-choice until his retirement in June 2012 at the age of 37.

Coaching career
After retiring, Tiago started working as a goalkeeper coach for both the youth and reserve teams of Sporting. Ahead of the 2017–18 campaign, he was promoted to the main squad in the same role.

Subsequently, Tiago worked in the same capacity with Portimonense SC's under-23 side and G.D. Chaves. In June 2019, he returned to the Estádio José Alvalade.

Honours
Sporting
Primeira Liga: 2001–02
Taça de Portugal: 2001–02, 2006–07, 2007–08
Supertaça Cândido de Oliveira: 1995, 2002, 2007, 2008
Taça da Liga runner-up: 2007–08, 2008–09

References

External links

1975 births
Living people
People from Torres Vedras
Portuguese footballers
Association football goalkeepers
Primeira Liga players
Segunda Divisão players
Sporting CP footballers
C.F. Estrela da Amadora players
Sportspeople from Lisbon District
Sporting CP non-playing staff
Association football goalkeeping coaches